Frank Buck may refer to:

Frank Buck (Tennessee politician) (born 1943), state legislator in Tennessee
Frank Buck (animal collector) (1884–1950), American wildlife importer and media personality
Frank E. Buck (1884–1970), Canadian horticulturalist
Frank H. Buck (1887–1942), U.S. representative from California 1933–1942